Daniele Seccarecci (10 June 1980 – 3 September 2013) was an Italian bodybuilder.

Biography
Born in Livorno, at a young age he moved with his family to Syracuse. From an early age he became interested in the world of bodybuilding, getting good results in the junior category. At 26 years he turned professional and at the 2006 Spanish Grand Prix he went close to qualifying for the Mister Olympia.  He was certified in 2010 by the Guinness World Records as the heaviest competitive bodybuilder, with a competition weight of 135 kg (298 lbs). He had an affair with porn star Brigitta Bulgari, whom he casually met at Milan's airport and then a relation with professional bodybuilder Daniela D'Emilia. He was arrested in 2011 under charges of illegal steroid marketing and briefly subject to home detention. He died of a heart attack on 4 September 2013 at 33 years of age in Taranto.

Professional career

References

External links
Official site

1980 births
2013 deaths
Italian bodybuilders
Professional bodybuilders